Belgravia Secondary School, also known as Belgravia High School is an English-medium school in Athlone, a suburb of Cape Town, South Africa.

History
The school was founded by six people on 21 January 1957 when it was called the Athlone Secondary School No. 2. It was not until 1957 that it got the name of Belgravia and it took until 1959 before there were brick buildings.

During the Western Cape Youth Uprising of 1976 the students at both Alexander Sinton Secondary School and this school boycotted classes on 16 August during a period that saw marches, random acts of arson and battles between students and the police.

References

Schools in Cape Town
Educational institutions established in 1957
1957 establishments in South Africa
Athlone, Cape Town